The 1919–20 season was Manchester United's 24th season in the Football League, ninth in the First Division, and first season back in the Football League and the FA Cup after the cancellation of competitive league football during First World War.

Prior to the start of the season, the Football League expanded the number of teams taking part in the league to 22 teams, giving Manchester United their first taste of a 42-match league season.

First Division

FA Cup

References

Manchester United F.C. seasons
Manchester United